Jim Warren (July 20, 1936 – November 24, 2021) was an American mathematics and computing educator, computer professional, entrepreneur, editor, publisher and continuing sometime activist.

Early career 
From 1957 to 1967, Warren was a mathematics teacher at secondary-school level, and professor at college and university levels, with his last full-time academic position being Chair of the Mathematics Department at the College of Notre Dame, Belmont, a small liberal arts college in Belmont, California. He later taught computer courses at Stanford University, San Jose State University and San Francisco State University.

In the ensuing decade, he was also a National Science Foundation Guest Lecturer, was the founder and Director of Summer Mathematics Institutes at Our Lady of the Lake University in San Antonio, Texas, and earned national recognition for innovative weekly enrichment programs he created for secondary school students, and for in-service programs for elementary and secondary school teachers, all without cost, as Chair of the Alamo District [South Texas] Council of Teachers of Mathematics (1960–1962).

In the late 1960s, Warren was involved in the radical, utopian, alternative, hippie Midpeninsula Free University, including serving pro-bono as its elected General Secretary for three terms. In that time, he created and edited its irregular magazine, which he titled The Free You.

Computing 
From 1968 through the mid-1970s Warren worked as a freelance minicomputer programmer and computer consultant, operating under the name, Frelan Associates (for "free land"), creating assembler-level real-time data-acquisition and process-control programs for biomedical research at Stanford Medical Center, and control programs for various high-tech companies around Silicon Valley. In those years, he also chaired the Association for Computing Machinery's regional chapters of SIGPLAN, SIGMICRO and the San Francisco Peninsula ACM.

In 1977, Warren co-founded the West Coast Computer Faire which, for a half-dozen years, was the largest public microcomputer convention in the world. He was its self-titled "Faire Chaircreature," organizing eight conventions.  In 1983, he sold the Faire to Prentice-Hall, "for 100% down; nothin' to pay".

To promote the Computer Faires and circulate news and gossip about the then-infant microcomputer industry, he founded and edited the first free tabloid newspaper about microcomputing, the irregular Silicon Gulch Gazette (SGG), published from issue #0 in February 1977, through issue #43, in January 1986, with one issue named Business Systems Journal.

Beginning in 1978, Warren created and published the Intelligent Machines Journal (IMJ, which is also Pig Latin for "Jim"), the first subscription news periodical about microcomputing, published as a tabloid newspaper, with Tom Williams as its founding Editor. Warren sold IMJ in late 1979, to Patrick McGovern, the founder of the International Data Group and numerous computer periodicals worldwide, notably including Computerworld. McGovern quickly renamed IMJ to be InfoWorld, as his first microcomputer periodical, later converting it to various glossy magazine formats.

He hosted PBS television's Computer Chronicles series for their first two seasons (originated at the College of San Mateo's KCSM-TV, Channel 60, 1981–1982).

Warren also founded and published the short-lived DataCast magazine, edited by Tony Bove and Cheryl Rhodes, focused on in-depth tutorials about specific microcomputer programs, and was the founder and producer of the equally ill-fated Video Initiative, providing similar self-paced videotape tutorials.

Warren was the founding Editor of Dr. Dobb's Journal of Computer Calisthenics & Orthodontia, the first computer magazine to focus on microcomputer software, created and published by the nonprofit People's Computer Company.

From 1990 to 1995, he was a member of the Board of Directors of Autodesk, Inc., one of the best-known publishers of computer-aided design (CAD) programs for microcomputers, with AutoCAD as its flagship product. At the time, it was one of the largest microcomputer software publishers, with a market cap sometimes near a billion dollars. His tenure there including presenting Autodesk's position opposing software patents, and chairing the Board's CEO Search Committee that found and selected Carol Bartz as its CEO.

Activism 
Warren founded and chaired the first Computers, Freedom and Privacy Conference, held in 1991, which drew more than a hundred articles of press coverage, internationally. The CFP conferences have continued, under other leadership, for more than 25 years, consistently drawing national and international attention and attendance.

In 1993, he assisted Debra Bowen pro-bono, then a freshman member of the California State Assembly, in drafting Assembly Bill 1624 (AB 1624) and organized much of the statewide support that helped it pass four committee votes and three floor votes without a single dissenting vote. When AB 1624 took effect on January 1, 1994, it made California the first state in the nation to open all of its computerized public legislative records, statutes, constitution and regulations, to fee-free access via the Internet.

Thereafter, numerous other states modeled their own legislation after AB1624, as evidenced by their use of the same eccentric phrasing that Warren drafted in AB 1624 to describe the Internet, which was relatively unknown at the time: "the largest nonproprietary, nonprofit cooperative public computer network". This was necessary to silence naive politicians objecting that it would be "giving away" public records to the Internet "company".

In 1995–1996, Warren served on the Advisory Panel on Electronic Filings of the California Secretary of State. This panel advised the Secretary on how-best to implement new mandates for computerizing political-campaign financial statements, and making them timely-available to the public in electronic form without excessive fees.

In 1996–1997, he served on the California Senate's Task Force on Electronic Access to Public Records, that produced recommendations regarding how to make computerized state and local public government records available to the public in electronic form. Warren was one of the minority who advocated online access without agency fees, and charging no more than the direct incremental cost of copying, when copies were requested in physical form. The majority of Task Force members were from city and county agencies, almost entirely advocating making the records available in electronic form, but only for fees far in excess of direct copying costs.

Political career 
In 1985, Warren was elected countywide, in a county of 700,000 population, to the board of trustees of the three-college San Mateo County Community College District, for 1986–1989.

In 1986, knowing he had no chance of winning, Warren nonetheless ran unsuccessfully for San Mateo County Supervisor against then-President of the County Board of Supervisors, Anna Eshoo, as a protest of her representation of the county's rural minority that composed much of her supervisorial district.

Other works 
Aside from the several periodicals and conference proceedings mentioned above, Warren also created, published and edited the Peninsula Citizens' Advocate tabloid newspaper, addressing local rural political issues (very irregularly, 1984–1986).

Warren was the Futures columnist for Microtimes, writing a monthly "Realizable Fantasies" column (1990–2001); the Government Access columnist for Boardwatch magazine (1994–1996), and the Public Access columnist for Government Technology magazine (1993–1996, 2000). Warren also wrote the nontechnical "Coastside Curmudgeon" column for the Half Moon Bay Review, Half Moon Bay, CA (1994–1996).

He also wrote the first invited, refereed survey of early personal computer developments in Computer magazine, a 15-year retrospective called "We, The People, In The Information Age" in Dr. Dobb's Journal, January 1991, etc.

Education 
Warren held an MS in Computer Engineering from Stanford (1977), an MS in Medical Information Science from the University of California, San Francisco Medical Center (1974), an MA in Mathematics & Statistics from the University of Texas at Austin (1964), and a BA in Mathematics & IA (1959) from what was then Southwest Texas State Teachers College in San Marcos, Texas. He completed all but his dissertation ("ABD") for a Ph.D. in EE-Computer Engineering from Stanford (advanced to candidacy, 1975).

Awards 
First-year recipient of the Electronic Frontier Foundation's Pioneer Award (1992)
The Hugh M. Hefner First Amendment Award from the Playboy Foundation (1994)
The James Madison Freedom-of-Information Award from the Society of Professional Journalists, Northern California (1994)
The John Dvorak Lifetime Achievement Award (1995)

References

Further reading 
The California Public Records Act (PRA) Government Code 6250–6270
The Secret History of Hacking, a 2001 documentary film featuring Warren.

External links 
interview including Jim Warren about the West Coast Computer Faire
Russell D. Hoffman Interviews Jim Warren
Jim Warren at the eekim wiki
Jim Warren in the 1990s

Media 

1936 births
2021 deaths
Stanford University faculty
Notre Dame de Namur University faculty
Stanford University alumni
University of California, San Francisco alumni
University of Texas at Austin alumni
Our Lady of the Lake University
People from Oakland, California